The Secret Life of My Secretary is a 2019 South Korean television series starring Kim Young-kwang, Jin Ki-joo, Kim Jae-kyung and Koo Ja-sung. It aired from May 6 to June 25, 2019.

Synopsis 
A department manager of a mobile media company getting to know who are his real friends and foes after losing his ability to recognize faces ("face-blindness") due to an attack on him, and teaming up with his secretary to try and solve the mystery while falling in love with her. His face-blindess is essential to the plot.

Cast

Main 
 Kim Young-kwang as Do Min-ik
 Director of T&T Mobile Media 1. An intelligent, yet a needy and problematic boss who calls out for his secretary for everything.
 Jin Ki-joo as Jung Gal-hee
 Secretary to T&T Mobile Media 1 Director Do Min-ik. An obedient, lively secretary who has a harsh way of talking.
 Kim Jae-kyung as Veronica Park/Park Ok-sun
 CEO of film production company Cinepark and heiress of the Park Group. She boasts excellence in her work but has an audacious personality and a messy personal life.
 Koo Ja-sung as Ki Dae-joo
 Director of T&T Mobile Media 2. Best friend of Do Min-ik. He is capable of stealing hearts with his talent as well as his gentle and sweet personality. He is the love interest of Veronica Park.

Supporting

People around Do Min-ik 
 Kim Min-sang as Sim Hae-yong, Min-ik's uncle who is the CEO of T&T Mobile
 Jung Ae-ri as Sim Hae-ra, Min-ik's mother who is the Chairman of T&T Art Centre
 Kim Byung-chun as Goo Seok-chan, Min-ik's doctor; neurosurgeon at Sangmo Hospital
 Choi Tae-hwan as Eun Jung-soo, Min-ik's chauffeur

Jung Gal-hee's family 
 Seo Dong-won as Jung Joong-hee, Gal-hee's older brother
 Kim Ji-min as Jung Nam-hee, Gal-hee's younger sister
 Kim Hee-jung as Go Si-rye, Gal-hee's mother

People at T&T Mobile 
Jang So-yeon as Lee Eul-wang, secretary to T&T Mobile Media 2 Director Ki Dae-joo
Han Ji-sun as Mo Ha-ni, secretary to T&T Mobile's CEO Sim Hae-yong
 Son San as Goo Myung-jung, secretary at T&T Mobile
 Choi Yoon-ra as Boo Se-young, secretary at T&T Mobile
 Kwon So-hyun as Ha Ri-ra, secretary at T&T Mobile
 Lee Seung-hyung as Director Park, one of T&T Mobile's external directors supporting Sim Hae-yong
 Kim Kyeong-ryong as Director Lee, one of T&T Mobile's external directors supporting Sim Hae-yong
 Kwon Hong-suk as Director Kim, one of T&T Mobile's external directors supporting Sim Hae-yong

Others 
 Baek Hyun-joo as Park Seok-ja, Veronica's mother 
 Jo Jae-ryeong as Uhm Han-il, detective at Yeongdeungpo Police Station
 Song Jin-woo as Woo Doo-han, detective at Yeongdeungpo Police Station

Special appearances 
 Lee Moon-sik as doctor Goo Seok-chan's face that Do Min-ik saw wrong (ep. 2)
 Kim Jung-pal as doctor Goo Seok-chan's face that Do Min-ik saw wrong (ep. 2)
 Kim Ki-doo as doctor Goo Seok-chan's face that Do Min-ik saw wrong (ep. 2)
 Kim Kwang-kyu as director at Gal-hee's interview (ep. 3)
 Bae Hae-sun as Dr. Park (ep. 8)
 Oh Young-sil as cleaner (ep. 14)
 Woo Hyun as man in sauna (ep. 16)
 Choi Jung-woo as Do Wan-bae, Min-ik's father (ep. 25)

Original soundtrack

Part 1

Part 2

Part 3

Part 4

Part 5

Part 6

Part 7

Part 8

Part 9

Part 10

Part 11

Ratings
In this table,  represent the lowest ratings and  represent the highest ratings.

Awards and nominations

Notes

References

External links
  
 
 

Seoul Broadcasting System television dramas
Korean-language television shows
2019 South Korean television series debuts
2019 South Korean television series endings
South Korean romantic comedy television series
South Korean workplace television series